From List of National Natural Landmarks, these are the National Natural Landmarks in Virgin Islands.  There are 7 in total.

Virgin Islands